The statue of Robert Burns (also known as the Burns Monument) in Milwaukee, Wisconsin, is a work of public art by the Scottish artist William Grant Stevenson, RSA. The bronze statue, of the Scottish national poet Robert Burns, stands on a plinth of Nova Scotia pink granite with two bronze bas relief panels. The monument was donated to the City of Milwaukee by James A. Bryden.

Sculptor 

William Grant Stevenson was a prolific Scottish sculptor and a member of the prestigious artists' collective the Royal Scottish Academy, to which he was elected in 1896. Stevenson first became world famous for his sculptures of Robert Burns in 1879, when his marble statue was selected from 21 competition entries as the best statue for the Burns Monument in Kay Park, Kilmarnock, Scotland. Stevenson worked out of the Dean Studio in Edinburgh with his brother and fellow sculptor, David Watson Stevenson, RSA.  W. G. Stevenson is also recognized for his colossal bronze statue of Sir William Wallace in Aberdeen.

While Stevenson's statues of Burns in Kilmarnock and Milwaukee are similar, under close inspection it can be seen that the two figures have distinctly different arm positions and hand gestures. Additionally, the Kilmarnock statue was chiseled from Sicilian marble whereas that in Milwaukee was cast in bronze. Statues of Burns created by Stevenson and the Dean Studio can also be found in Denver, Chicago, and Fredericton, New Brunswick.

Details

Statue 

The bronze figure represents the popular Scottish poet standing, facing south, with a notebook in one hand. Its portrayal of Burns is reminiscent of paintings by Alexander Nasmyth showing the poet as a young man. Burns is dressed in a "claw-hammer" coat, knee breeches, vest, cravat, and woolen hose. In his left hand, Burns is holding a notebook with fingers in between the pages; in his right he holds a quill pen.

The statue was cast in Edinburgh at the Dean Studio, shipped to New York in December 1908, and then transported to Milwaukee.

The Burns Monument is composed of a bronze statue, two bronze bas reliefs, and an engraved plinth of Nova Scotia pink granite.  All four sides of the plinth are engraved, with bronze panels reliefs installed on the western and eastern faces.

Bronze bas relief panels 
The bronze panels on the Burns Monument are in the bas relief style. The western bas relief, entitled Burns at the Plough, shows the poet resting his team of horses while plowing.   The eastern bas relief, entitled A Cotter's Saturday Night, depicts a scene from Burns's poem of the same name.

Inscriptions 
The front of the plinth is inscribed ROBERT BURNS.

On the back of the plinth are inscribed the words THE GIFT OF JAMES ANDERSON BRYDEN A NATIVE OF SCOTLAND TO THE CITY OF HIS ADOPTION 1909.

Under the western relief, inscribed in the granite plinth is the text, THE POETIC GENIUS OF MY COUNTRY FOUND ME AT THE PLOUGH AND THREW HER INSPIRING MANTLE OVER ME.

Under the eastern relief, the granite plinth is engraved with the text, FROM SCENES LIKE THESE OLD SCOTIA'S GRANDEUR SPRINGS.

Location 
The Burns Monument is located in Burns Commons on the east side of Milwaukee, Wisconsin. It stands within a triangular park, referred to as the Burns Triangle, that is bounded by North Prospect Ave., East Knapp St., and North Franklin Pl.  The location for the Burns statue was selected by James A. Bryden, Milwaukee City Engineer Charles J. Poetsch, Deputy Commissioner of the Public Works J. P. Sherer, Andrew Agnew, and the east division engineer.

Table

Donor 
The Burns Monument was donated to the City of Milwaukee by James Anderson Bryden, a Scottish immigrant born in Bankshill, near Lockerbie, Dumfriesshire. Bryden's family came to the United States in 1840, first making a home in Utica, New York. The family moved to Milwaukee in 1857 and James Bryden began working in the grain trade. His early years were spent working on the farm, which later in life helped him during his chance meeting with Abraham Lincoln. Bryden's early years on the farm are also said to have influenced his love for the poetic works of Robert Burns, known in Scotland as the Ploughman Poet. A photograph of Bryden standing in front of the Burns Monument was published in the newspaper about one month before the unveiling ceremony.  News reports stated that Bryden's favorite Burns poem was "A Cotter's Saturday Night".

Unveiling ceremony 
The unveiling ceremony for the Burns Monument was held on Saturday, June 26, 1909, at 2pm. The day's events began as a crowd of several hundred assembled at the Plankinton House and moved in procession to the Burns Monument, led by the Caledonian Pipe Band. An invocation was given to the attendees by Rev. Frederick Edwards. The Burns song, "There Was a Lad Was Born in Kyle" was performed by the Lyric Glee Club.  Introductory remarks were given by the chairman of the day, Andrew D. Agnew. The statue was unveiled by Miss Juneau Theiline McGee, the great-great granddaughter of Solomon Juneau; the first mayor of Milwaukee.  Approximately 2,000 people attended the ceremony.

Judge Joseph V. Quarles gave an eloquent speech on Robert Burns and concluded with the official Presentation of the Burns Monument to the City of Milwaukee. "Mr. Mayor, in behalf of James A. Bryden, our neighbor and friend, I have the honor to tender this monument to the people of Milwaukee. Be pleased to accept it in their behalf and I doubt not that they will see to it that it is suitably protected and maintained."  Mayor David Stuart Rose accepted the monument on behalf of the city.  The Lyric Glee Club sang another famous Burns song, "Scots Wha Ha'e", for the audience.  After the musical interlude, rhetorical addresses were given to the audience by John G. Gregory and Hon. Ogden H. Fethers. General Arthur MacArthur Jr gave an address to the audience about Scottish characteristics and poetry.

Then, after calls from the crowd to hear from the donor, James Bryden spoke to the assembled audience.

The exercises concluded with the audience and Lyric Glee Club singing the popular and well-known Robert Burns song, "Auld Lang Syne".

Conservation 

James Bryden was President of the Saint Andrew's Society of the City of Milwaukee from 1898 to 1899. The members of the Saint Andrew's Society have helped celebrate and care for the Burns Monument over the many decades since James Bryden donated it to Milwaukee.

Given the age of the Burns Monument, maintenance is required periodically to clean the statue of superficial corrosion and restore the protective coating.  An editorial newspaper article in 1987 documented in detail the deteriorated state of several statues in Milwaukee, including the Robert Burns statue. In 1994, the Saint Andrew's Society of the City of Milwaukee, the Greater Milwaukee Committee, the Burns Club of Milwaukee, and other private donors funded cleaning and restoration of the Burns Monument. The respected monument conservator Douglas D. Kwart was hired to perform the statue conservation work.

A formal rededication ceremony was held on August 28, 1994. In attendance where members of the Milwaukee County Government, Parks Department, Saint Andrew's Society, and the local Scottish community.

Burns Triangle landscaping 

In 2010, the Saint Andrew's Society, in collaboration with the Milwaukee County Parks, organized private donations to fund and install a walkway of commemorative engraved granite pavers around the base of the Burns Monument. With the walkway in place, visitors to the statue can see the monument engravings and bas reliefs up-close without walking through the rose bushes or the flower beds.

In 2013, granite benches were privately donated and installed in the Burns Triangle, in collaboration with the Milwaukee County Parks, to allow visitors to sit and view the statue.  The granite benches are engraved with selections of Burns's poetry.

Wreath-laying ceremonies 
A wreath-laying celebration is held annually at the monument. The annual wreath-laying ceremony, which by tradition begins at 2:00 pm, is held on the Sunday nearest to Robert Burns's birthday, January 25.  Local Scots, Burnsians, and members of the Saint Andrew's Society gather in celebration at the Burns Monument to recite poetry, play the bagpipes, and sing Burns's songs.

See also 
Burns Commons
Burns Monument, Kilmarnock
List of Robert Burns memorials
William Grant Stevenson
William Wallace Statue, Aberdeen

References

1909 sculptures
Articles containing video clips
Bronze sculptures in Wisconsin
Cultural depictions of Robert Burns
Monuments and memorials in Wisconsin
Outdoor sculptures in Milwaukee
Sculptures of men in Wisconsin
Statues in Wisconsin
Burns